Starks is an unincorporated community in Kane County in the U.S. state of Illinois, located just south of the McHenry County border. Hampshire lies to its northwest, and Pingree Grove lies to its southeast.

In the Illinois highway system, Starks is noted for having a wrong-way concurrency. Westbound U.S. Route 20 and eastbound Illinois Route 72 are concurrent together with northbound Illinois Route 47 through Starks.

References

Unincorporated communities in Illinois
Unincorporated communities in Kane County, Illinois